Kaskar or Kaškar may refer to:

 Chitral, city in present Pakistan, formerly capital of a princely state in British India, now of a district 
 Kaškar, an Ancient Arabian city, former bishopric and Catholic titular see in present Oman
 Battle of Kaskar, fought between the Rashidun Caliphate and the Sassanian Empire
 Shabir Ibrahim Kaskar (died 1981), Indian criminal
 Dawood Ibrahim Kaskar, a criminal and terrorist

See also 
 Kashkar (disambiguation)
 Cascar (disambiguation)